Isidro Pérez (May 24, 1964 – January 9, 2013) was a Mexican professional boxer in the Lightweight division. Pérez is a former two-time WBO Flyweight Champion.

Professional career
In May 1986, Isidro won the Mexican National Light Flyweight Championship by beating veteran Jorge Cano.

WBC Light Flyweight Championship
In his first World Championship attempt he lost a very disputed twelve-round decision to Jung-Koo Chang in Chungmu Gymnasium, Daejeon, South Korea.

WBO Flyweight Championship
On August 18, 1990 Pérez won the WBO Flyweight Championship by upsetting Puerto Rico's Angel Rosario with a twelfth round T.K.O. in Ponce, Puerto Rico.

Death
Isidro Pérez was reported to have died in Mexico in January 2013, he was reported missing earlier. Perez's friends and family have not heard from him in months previous to reporting him missing and he  has not cashed a pension check since September 2012. Date of death was not reported.

See also
List of Mexican boxing world champions
List of WBO world champions
List of flyweight boxing champions

References

External links

1964 births
2013 deaths
Boxers from Guerrero
World boxing champions
World Boxing Organization champions
World flyweight boxing champions
Flyweight boxers
Mexican male boxers